Philip Plater (6 June 1866 – 12 May 1943) was a British sports shooter. He competed at the 1908 Summer Olympics and the 1912 Summer Olympics.

References

External links
 

1866 births
1943 deaths
British male sport shooters
Olympic shooters of Great Britain
Shooters at the 1908 Summer Olympics
Shooters at the 1912 Summer Olympics
Sportspeople from Kensington
Sportspeople from London
20th-century British people